The Confederation of Free Trade Unions of Ukraine (KVPU) is a national trade union center in Ukraine. It is affiliated with the International Trade Union Confederation.

The federation's origins lie in the Co-ordinating Council of Free Trade Unions of Ukraine, formed during the collapse of the Soviet Union. In November 1993, the council was refounded as the KVPU. Its founding affiliates were:

 Federation Trade Union of Ukrainian Aviation Dispatchers
 Free Trade Union of Locomotive Engineers
 Independent Trade Union of Ukrainian Miners
 Trade Union Association of Ukrainian Civil Aviation Pilots
 Trade Union of Air Engineers
 Trade Union of Textile Workers

In 1996, a dispute over the leadership led the founding affiliates to withdraw, although this was later resolved.

It is one of the few trade unions in Ukraine recognized by the American AFL–CIO as "being independent and honest in its representation of the interests of labor".

Affiliates
The following unions were affiliated in 2019:

References

External links
 KVPU official site .
 :uk:Конфедерація вільних профспілок України Wiki page ]

International Trade Union Confederation
National trade union centers of Ukraine